Scott Brothers may refer to:

 The Scott Brothers, Canadian television personalities, see Property Brothers (franchise)
 The Singing Scott Brothers, a close harmony variety act in the UK, also variously called Scott Brothers or Scott Bros.
 Scott Brothers (locomotive manufacturers), Christchurch, New Zealand